Electrophobia is the morbid fear of electricity. A person suffering from electrophobia will feel intense anxiety when having to deal with electricity, and even the thought of exposure to electricity may trigger anxiety. The fear of electricity isn't completely irrational because electricity can be dangerous. However, people with electrophobia have lost their ability to rationalize the situation.

See also
Electrical injury and electrical burn
Electromagnetic hypersensitivity
Radiophobia

References

Electricity
Phobias